The Church of San Juan Bautista (also known as the Iglesia de San Juan Degollado, where degollado means "beheaded") is a Catholic church dedicated to St John the Baptist that is located in the village of Jodra del Pinar in Saúca, Spain. It was declared a Property of Cultural Interest in 1990.

References 

Bien de Interés Cultural landmarks in the Province of Guadalajara
Churches in the Province of Guadalajara
Romanesque architecture in Castilla–La Mancha